Wellington A. Playter (9 December 1879 – 15 July 1937) was an English actor. He appeared in 43 films between 1913 and 1921.

Selected filmography
(Note:* means that he was credited as Wellington Playter)
 The Daughter of the Hills (1913)
 An American Citizen (1914)
 The Ring and the Man (1914)
 The County Chairman (1914)
 Marta of the Lowlands (1914) *
 The Man from Mexico (1914)
 The Morals of Marcus (1915)
 Coral (1915) *
 The Slave Market (1917) *
 The Sin Woman (1917) *
 Polly of the Circus (1917) *
 The Eagle's Eye (1918)
 The Wicked Darling (1919)
 The Struggle Everlasting (1918)
 Spotlight Sadie (1919) *
 Fool's Gold (1919) 
 Back to God's Country (1919)

References

External links

1879 births
1937 deaths
English male film actors
English male silent film actors
Male actors from York
20th-century English male actors